Mexican Museum may refer to: 

 Musée mexicain in Paris, hosted in the Louvre from 1850 to 1887
 Mexican Museum (San Francisco), opened in 1975
 National Museum of Mexican Art in Chicago, opened in 1982
 Mexic-Arte Museum in Austin, Texas, founded in 1983

See also
 List of museums in Mexico